Forcible Entry Act is a stock short title used for legislation in the jurisdictions of both the United Kingdom and Ireland relating to forcible entry.

List
Acts of the Parliament of England
The Forcible Entry Act 1381
Statutes concerning forcible entries and riots confirmed or the Forcible Entry Act 1391
The Forcible Entry Act 1429
The Forcible Entry Act 1588
The Forcible Entry Act 1623

Act of the Parliament of Ireland
The Forcible Entry Act 1786 (26 Geo 3 c 24 (I.)) (Repealed by section 16 of, and the Third Schedule to the Criminal Law Act, 1997)

See also
List of short titles

Lists of legislation by short title
Criminal law of the United Kingdom